is a Japanese tennis player.

On 3 April 2017, she reached her best singles ranking of world No. 188. On 21 November 2016, she peaked at No. 95 in the doubles rankings. Omae has won six singles titles and 23 doubles titles on the ITF Circuit.

Her biggest title for Omae to date was when she won the doubles event at the 2015 Dunlop World Challenge, partnering with Peangtarn Plipuech.

WTA career finals

Doubles: 1 (runner-up)

ITF Circuit finals

Singles: 10 (6 titles, 4 runner–ups)

Doubles: 43 (23 titles, 20 runner–ups)

External links
 
 

1993 births
Living people
Japanese female tennis players
Sportspeople from Kyoto
Sportspeople from Shiga Prefecture
21st-century Japanese women